John Brox (November 16, 1910 – December 30, 1995) was an American farmer and politician who served in the Massachusetts House of Representatives. A member of the Republican Party, he was defeated for reelection in a new district in 1964 by Felix Perrault.

See also
 Massachusetts legislature: 1949–1950, 1951–1952, 1953–1954, 1955–1956

References

1910 births
1995 deaths
Republican Party members of the Massachusetts House of Representatives
20th-century American politicians